The Seeds is the debut album by American garage rock band the Seeds. It was released in April 1966 through GNP Crescendo Records and produced by Sky Saxon. After the release of two singles in 1965, "Can't Seem to Make You Mine" and "Pushin' Too Hard", the album was released and charted in the United States where it peaked at No. 132 on the Billboard Top LPs & Tapes chart. Modern reception of the album is positive, with critics considering the album's similarity to punk rock a decade later.

Style 

Like many garage rock bands, lead singer Sky Saxon's vocal style was influenced by the vocals of Rolling Stones front man Mick Jagger, but have also received comparisons to the vocals of rockabilly acts such as Buddy Holly and Eddie Cochran.

Release 

The Seeds released two singles ahead of the album: "Can't Seem to Make You Mine" in June 1965 and "Pushin' Too Hard" in November. The Seeds  was released in April 1966 and charted in the United States, peaking at No. 132 on the Billboard Top LPs & Tapes chart. The first single to follow up the album's release was "Try to Understand", which failed to chart in the US. "Pushin' Too Hard" was re-issued in October 1966 and peaked at No. 36 in the US in February 1967.

The Seeds has been re-issued several times in the United Kingdom on vinyl and CD. Several re-issues contain bonus tracks while the album itself has also been re-released as a double album on compact disc with the Seeds' second album, A Web of Sound.

In 2012, Big Beat Records re-released the Seeds' debut album as a deluxe edition, with the album in remastered mono form, plus ten new bonus tracks of previously unreleased material.

Reception 

Modern reception of the album has been generally positive. In their review for the double disc re-issue, AllMusic gave the album a positive rating of four and a half stars out of five, writing "The Seeds is probably the best album by any of the original American garage bands, without the usual time-filling cover versions and elongated jams, and of course it features the immortal 'Pushin' Too Hard' and the even better 'Can't Seem to Make You Mine', two classics of the Nuggets era." The British music magazine Uncut gave the compilation a positive rating of four and half stars out of five, describing the album as "...A brilliantly simple, headlong surge of fuzz-drenched guitar, bubbling organ riffs and Saxon's raw, throat-tearing vocals..." Many of the tracks are featured in The Seeds biopic documentary "Pushin' Too Hard" which had a sold out premiere in London in 2019.

Track listing

Personnel 

 Musical personnel

 Sky Saxon – bass guitar, harmonica, vocals, producer, concept, cover art, liner notes
 Rick Andridge – drums
 Chuck Britz – engineer
 Cooker – guitar, bottleneck guitar
 Daryl Hooper – melodica, organ, piano, keyboards, vocals
 Jan Savage – guitar, rhythm guitar, vocals

 Production personnel

 Mike Durrough – engineering, remixing, mixing
 David Hassinger – engineering
 Lanky Linstrot – engineering
 Stan Ross – remixing
 Doc Siegel – remixing
 Rafael O. Valentin – engineering
 Alec Palao - Executive Producer
 Neil Norman - Executive Producer

Notes

References

External links 
 

1966 debut albums
The Seeds albums
GNP Crescendo Records albums